Alfian bin Sa'at (born 18 July 1977), best known as Alfian Sa'at, is a prolific Singaporean playwright, poet, and writer. He is known for penning a body of plays, poems, and prose that often tackle issues considered taboo in the island-state, such as race, sexuality, and politics. Alfian has received a number of national literature awards, such as the 2001 Young Artist Award and three Life! Theatre Awards for Best Original Script. Alfian is the resident playwright of theatre group W!LD RICE.

Biography

Early life
Alfian bin Sa'at is a Muslim Singaporean of Minangkabau, Javanese and Chinese Hakka descent. An alumnus of Tampines Primary School, Raffles Institution, and Raffles Junior College, Alfian was the chairman of the drama societies, both known as Raffles Players, in both RI and RJC. He also took part in the Creative Arts Programme twice – once at fifteen, and a second time at seventeen – both times under the mentorship of Haresh Sharma. He has since returned to the programme as an occasional mentor. During his two years at RJC, Alfian received the Kripalani Award for Outstanding Contribution to Creative Arts. Alfian attended medical classes at the National University of Singapore but did not graduate.

Career
In 1998, Alfian published his first collection of poetry, One Fierce Hour at the age of twenty-one. The book was acclaimed as "truly a landmark for poetry [in Singapore]" by The Straits Times, and Alfian himself was described by Malaysia's New Straits Times as "one of the most acclaimed poets in his country... a prankish provocateur, libertarian hipster". A year later, Alfian published his first collection of short stories, Corridor, which won the Singapore Literature Prize Commendation Award. Seven of the short stories from the collection have since been adapted for television. In 2001, he published his second collection of poetry, A History of Amnesia, which was hailed by The Straits Times as "one of the most powerful collections by a Singaporean" in addition to being shortlisted for a Kiriyama Asia-Pacific Book Prize. Alfian won both the inaugural National Arts Council-Singapore Press Holdings Golden Point Award for Poetry in the same year, as well as the National Arts Council's Young Artist Award for Literature.

Alfian's plays, written in both English and Malay, have received broad attention in both Singapore and Malaysia. They have also been translated into German and Swedish, and have been read and performed in London, Zurich, Stockholm, Berlin, Hamburg and Munich. His first play was produced when he was 19, and he has had a long association as a playwright with theatre group The Necessary Stage as well as with Teater Ekamatra, a Malay theatre group known for articulating minority concerns in Chinese-majority Singapore.

Alfian is currently the resident playwright of theatre group W!LD RICE.

In 2015, Nadirah was selected by The Business Times as one of the "finest plays in 50 years" alongside productions by Goh Poh Seng, Michael Chiang and Haresh Sharma and others.

In 2016, it was reported that sex.violence.blood.gore, a play he co-wrote, and his short story collection Malay Sketches is on the reading list of the School of Oriental and African Studies, University of London, while the University of York has his poem "Singapore You Are Not My Country" and West Virginia University his selected poems on their reading lists. In particular, the University of York's Dr Claire Chambers noted that this was because Alfian "introduces non-Anglophone words and concepts, and puts together words in an expressive portmanteau style".

Works

Plays

English
 Fighting (1994)
 Black Boards, White Walls (1997)
 Yesterday My Classmate Died (1997)
 sex.violence.blood.gore (co-written with Chong Tze Chien) (1999)
 Asian Boys Vol. 1 (loosely adapted from August Strindberg's A Dream Play) (2000) 
 What's The Difference? (2001)
 Don't Say I Say (2001)
 poppy dot dream (2001)
 The Corrected Poems of Minah Jambu (2001)
 The Optic Trilogy (2001)
 7 Ten: Seven Original 10-minute Plays: Not In (2003)
 Landmarks: Asian Boys Vol. 2  (2004)
 Tekka Voices (2004)
 Mengapa Isa? (2004)
 The Importance of Being Kaypoh (2005)
 Harmony Daze (2005)
 Confessions of 300 Unmarried Men: Blush (2006)
 Homesick (2006)
 Happy Endings: Asian Boys Vol 3 (2007)
 Snow White and the Seven Dwarfs (2008)
 Beauty And The Beast (2009)
 Cooling Off Day (2011)
 Cook a Pot of Curry (2013)
 Monkey Goes West (2014)
 Hotel (2015)
 Tiger of Malaya (2018)

Malay
 Deklamasi Malas (Declamation of Indolence) (1997)
 Dongeng (Myth) (1997)
 Anak Bulan di Kampung Wa' Hassan (The New Moon at Kampung Wa' Hassan) (1998)
 Madu II (Polygamy) (1998)
 Causeway (1998)
 Peti Kayu Ibuku (My Mother's Wooden Chest) (translated into Malay from Kuo Pao Kun's translation of Ng Xin Yue's original Mandarin text) (1999)
 The Miseducation of Minah Bukit (2001)
 Tapak 7 (Seven Steps) (2001)
 Selamat Malam Ibu (adapted from Night Mother by Marsha Norman) (2003)
 Keturunan Laksmana Tak Ada Anu (adapted from Descendants of the Eunuch Admiral by Kuo Pao Kun) (2003)
 Minah & Monyet (Minah & Monkey) (2003)
 Nadirah (2009)
 Pariah (alternatively staged as Parah) (2011)
 Kakak Kau Punya Laki (Your Sister's Husband) (2013)
 GRC (Geng Rebut Cabinet) (2015)
Mandarin
 Fugitives (失控) (co-written with Ng How Wee) (2002)

Prose
English
 Corridor (SNP, 1999; Ethos Books, 2015)  
 Malay Sketches (Ethos Books, 2012) 
Malay
 Bisik: Antologi Drama Melayu Singapura (Whisper: Anthology of Malay Singaporean Drama) (Pustaka Cipta, 2003)

Poetry
 One Fierce Hour (Landmark Books, 1998) 
 A History of Amnesia (Ethos Books, 2001) 
 The Invisible Manuscript (Math Paper Press, 2012)

Awards
 1995 – Kripalani Award for Outstanding Contribution to Creative Arts
 1998 – Commendation Award by the Malay Language Council for Causeway
 1999 – Singapore Literature Prize Commendation Award for Corridor
 2001 – Golden Point Award for Poetry
 2001 – Young Artist Award for Literature
 2005 – Life! Theatre Awards for Best Original Script for Landmarks: Asian Boys Vol. 2
 2006 – FRONT Award
 2010 – Life! Theatre Awards for Best Original Script for Nadirah
 2014 - Life! Theatre Awards for Best Original Script for Kakak Kau Punya Laki (Your Sister's Husband)

References

External links
 Naif's journal – The blog of Alfian Sa'at

1977 births
Living people
Singaporean people of Javanese descent
Singaporean people of Malay descent
Singaporean people of Minangkabau descent
National University of Singapore alumni
Raffles Junior College alumni
Raffles Institution alumni
Singaporean dramatists and playwrights
Singaporean Muslims
Singaporean poets
Singapore Literature Prize winners
Male dramatists and playwrights
Male poets